Boreotrophon pedroanus is a species of sea snail, a marine gastropod mollusk in the family Muricidae, the murex snails or rock snails.

Description

Distribution
This species occurs in the Pacific Ocean from California, USA - Baja California, Mexico

References

 Abbott R. T. (1974). American Seashells. The marine mollusca of the Atlantic and Pacific coast of North America. II edit. Van Nostrand, New York 663 p. + 24 pl: page(s): 191

Gastropods described in 1903
Boreotrophon